The Nahverteidigungswaffe was a roof mounted, breech-loaded, single shot, multi-purpose, 360° rotating grenade launcher that could fire a variety of ammunition. It was typically found on German tanks such as the Panzer IV, Panther I, Tiger I, and Tiger II from 1944 until the end of the war and was intended to replace three previous devices: the Nebelwurfgerät, the Minenabwurfvorrichtung, and pistol ports.

Operation
The Nahverteidigungswaffe was a simple breech-loaded launcher tube oriented at a 50° angle and fitted in a traversable mounting on the turret roof. Unlike the previous externally mounted launchers, it was not exposed to enemy fire, being reloaded from within the vehicle through a hinged breech. 

The Nahverteidigungswaffe was designed to mate with the standard  Kampfpistole flare gun and could be sealed by an armored plug when not in use. Aiming was by periscopes located on the turret and cupola.

Ammunition 

The device could fire the following ammunition:

 Schnellnebelkerze 39 smoke grenade for the purpose of concealment
 Rauchsichtzeichen Orange 350 smoke signal for identification to friendly aircraft
 Leuchtgeschoss R flare 
 Sprenggranatpatrone 326 Lp anti-personnel explosive to defend the vehicle against infantry attack 

It splintered to a circumferential distance of  after an initial delay time of one second. All turret hatches and openings were to be closed when this round was fired.

Deployment 
The Nahverteidigungswaffe was first mounted in March 1944 on the Panther tank. It was equipped on a variety of late-war vehicles, including the Sturmtiger and the Maus tank.

Gallery

See also
 Nebelkerzenabwurfvorrichtung
 Nebelwurfgerät
 Minenabwurfvorrichtung

Notes

References

External links 
http://www.custermen.net/nahvert/nah2.htm
http://panther1944.de/index.php/en/sdkfz-171-pzkpfwg-panther/technik/close-in-defense-weapon 
http://www.tigertank181.com/45_Nahverteidigungswaffe.htm
http://www.figuren.miniatures.de/nahverteidigungswaffe.html
http://www.geocities.ws/desertfox1891/NahVtdgW/artnahvtdgw.htm
https://www.lexpev.nl/grenades/europe/germany/rauchsichtzeichenorange.html

Anti-personnel weapons
Armoured fighting vehicle equipment
Flare guns
Grenade launchers
Smoke grenades
Tanks of Germany
World War II weapons of Germany
Weapons and ammunition introduced in 1944